Anat Knafo (born 3 September 1963) is an Israeli politician. She briefly served as a member of the Knesset for Yesh Atid in 2021.

Biography
Knafo grew up in Jerusalem and earned a BEd at David Yellin College of Education. She moved to the Israeli settlement of Har Adar in 2005, and was elected to its council in 2008, receiving around 35% of the vote. She was re-elected in 2013 with 45% of the vote.

She joined the centrist Yesh Atid party, and after it joined the Blue and White alliance prior to the April 2019 elections, was placed forty-seventh on the alliance's list. However, it won only 35 seats. She was given the forty-fourth spot for the September 2019 elections, again failing to win a seat. Given forty-fourth place again for the March 2020 elections, she failed to win a seat, but entered the Knesset on 2 February 2021 as a replacement for Hila Vazan. She did not run for re-election in the March 2021 elections.

Knafo is married, with four children.

References

External links

1963 births
Living people
People from Jerusalem
Israeli settlers
Yesh Atid politicians
Members of the 23rd Knesset (2020–2021)
Women members of the Knesset